D.B. Karnik (Marathi:द्वा.भ. कर्णिक) (14 January 1908 - 14 October 2005)  was an Indian journalist. He was the first editor of Maharashtra Times and held office for five years (June 1962 to September 1967).

Career
He is credited with starting four publications in Maharashtra. He was instrumental, as founder editor, of turning the Maharashtra Times into a dynamic, people oriented newspaper. He held office for a year and a half.  Before starting Maharashtra Times, he worked in Kesari and Prabhat newspaper. He was very close to Yashwantrao Chavan. 
He inspired many writers to contribute in the supplements of Maharashtra Times in the initial days. These include P. B. Bhave, and N. S. Phadke.

Books written
 Y.V. Chavan: A Political Biography 
 Mānavendranātha Rāẏa
 Alan Roy (एलन रॉय)
 संपादकाचे जीवनस्वप्न
 व्ही. बी. कर्णिक
 राजधानीतील बारा वर्षे 
 चित्ती असो द्यावे समाधान

Awards
He was awarded the Ratna Darpan (excellence in media) in 2002.

Death
He was left with wife and son and two daughters.

References

Journalists from Maharashtra
2005 deaths
1908 births
Indian male journalists
20th-century Indian journalists